Guancha.cn is a news site based in Shanghai, China. It was founded by Eric X. Li, a Chinese venture capitalist and political scientist, in 2012. Jin Zhongwei is the site's editor. It has been described as a nationalist or even ultranationalist website.

History 
In 2013, a number of techno-nationalists calling themselves the "Industrial Party" joined the site and have influenced it.

In 2020, the website has spoken out against Donald Trump's suspension from Twitter.

In 2021, the website criticized Intel's ban of using components from Xinjiang.

References

External links 
 (in Chinese)

2012 establishments in China
Chinese nationalism
Chinese news websites
Chinese propaganda organisations
Internet properties established in 2012